The Nancy Drew Notebooks are a series of books featuring the amateur sleuth Nancy Drew.  The stories are aimed at younger readers and portray an 8-year-old Nancy and her friends in the third grade. Each book is illustrated with eight black and white drawings. The series original illustrator was Anthony Accardo, later volumes were illustrated by Jan Naimo Jones, and Paul Casale . The "notebook" in the series title refers to the "blue notebook in which keeps track of her [Nancy] mysteries and writes down what she learns". The stories end with a moral message telling the reader what Nancy has learned. The cover layout has changed and evolved throughout the series. It was initially published by the Minstrel imprint and later switched to the Aladdin imprint. The series ended with volume #69 in December 2005, and was relaunched (from volume 1) as Nancy Drew and the Clue Crew.

The Nancy Drew Notebooks (1994–2005)

References

 
Series of children's books